Louves Minproff de Yaoundé, usually referred to simply as Louves Minproff, is a Cameroonian women's football club based in Yaoundé.

The team, which takes its name from the initials of the Minister of Women's Empowerment and the Family (Minproff), plays in the Guinness Super League. Louves translates from French as 'she-wolves'.

During its history the club has won five titles (2011, 2012, 2015, 2019 and 2020) and five domestic cups (2014, 2015, 2016, 2018 and 2019.

Current squad

References

Women's football in Cameroon
Cameroonian women's football clubs